Mike Gloor (born November 27, 1950, in Alliance, Nebraska) is a politician from the U.S. state of Nebraska.  A resident of Grand Island, he occupied a seat in the Nebraska Legislature from 2009 to 2017. He was succeeded in the Legislature by Dan Quick, a Democrat from Grand Island. 

Gloor was elected in 2008 to represent the 35th Nebraska legislative district. Former CEO of St. Francis Medical Center, he raised over $120,000 in his 2008 bid, double the typical amount raised. He held seats on the banking, commerce, and insurance committees, and served as the chairman of the revenue committee.

References

 

Living people
1950 births
Nebraska state senators
People from Alliance, Nebraska
21st-century American politicians
People from Grand Island, Nebraska